General Sir Robert Napier Hubert Campbell (Bobbie) Bray  (14 June 1908 – 14 August 1983) was a British soldier, deputy Supreme Commander Europe of NATO's Allied Command Europe from 1967 to 1970.

Education
Bray was educated at St Ronan's School, Worthing, followed by Gresham's School, Holt, and the Royal Military Academy, Woolwich.

Career
Bray was commissioned as a second lieutenant in the 1st Battalion of the Duke of Wellington's (West Riding) Regiment on 2 February 1928.

He served in North West Europe and the Middle East during the Second World War being promoted to temporary lieutenant colonel on 19 October 1942.

He became a Brigadier on the General Staff at the British Army of the Rhine in 1950 and then Director of Land-Air Warfare and North Atlantic Treaty Organization Standardization at the War Office in December 1954. Promoted to major-general on 29 October 1955, he became General Officer Commanding 56th (London) Armoured Division in April 1957. He then became GOC British Land Forces in the Arabian Peninsula in 1959 and GOC Middle East Land Forces in 1960.

He was promoted to lieutenant-general on 27 February 1961 and served as GOC-in-C at Southern Command from August 1961 to September 1963. He was promoted to full general on 25 February 1965. He was the colonel-in-chief of the Duke of Wellington's Regiment from 1965 to 1975. He served as Commander-in-Chief Allied Forces Northern Europe between November 1963 and February 1967 and as Deputy Supreme Commander Europe at NATO's Allied Command between May 1967 and December 1970, succeeding Marshal of the Royal Air Force Sir Thomas Pike. He retired on 9 March 1971.

Honours
1944 – Distinguished Service Order for gallant and distinguished services in Normandy
1945 – Bar to Distinguished Service Order for gallant and distinguished services in north west Europe
1952 – Commander of the Order of the British Empire
1956 – Companion of the Order of the Bath (CB)
1962 – Knight Commander of the Order of the Bath (KCB)
1966 – Knight Grand Cross of the Order of the British Empire (GBE)
Colonel of the Duke of Wellington's Regiment, October 1965 to July 1975
Mentioned in Despatches North West Frontier 1935
Mentioned in Despatches 20 December 1940

Notes

References

Bibliography
I Will Plant Me a Tree by Steve Benson and Martin Crossley Evans (James & James, London, 2002)

External links
Military Career of RNHC Bray at ordersofbattle.com
Glorious Gloucesters
The Duke of Wellington's Regiment (West Riding)
Honours and Awards of the Glosters
Multinational Commands RAF
British Army Officers 1939−1945
Generals of World War II

 

|-
 

|-

|-

1908 births
1983 deaths
British Army generals
British Army brigadiers of World War II
Companions of the Distinguished Service Order
Duke of Wellington's Regiment officers
Graduates of the Royal Military College, Sandhurst
Knights Commander of the Order of the Bath
Knights Grand Cross of the Order of the British Empire
NATO military personnel
People educated at Gresham's School
People from Worthing
Military personnel of British India